Cerastis salicarum, the willow dart, is a species of cutworm or dart moth from the family Noctuidae.

The MONA or Hodges number for Cerastis salicarum is 10996.

References

Further reading

 
 
 

Noctuinae
Articles created by Qbugbot
Moths described in 1857